Equitable Motion Picture Company was a short-lived but influential silent film company. It was launched in 1915. It was headed by Arthur Spiegel. It distributed its films through William A. Brady's World Film Company.  It was  acquired by World Film in 1916, with the agreement signed on January 29, 1916, afterwards it was consolidated under Brady's control.

In 1915 the startup film company signed Margarita Fischer and Harry Pollard, and also signed Clara Kimball Young It took over the Horsley (David Horsley) studio in Bayonne, New Jersey.

Cinematographer William C. Foster worked for Equitable.

Filmography
The Warning (1915)
The Cowardly Way (1915)
The Woman in 47 (1916)	
The Shadow of a Doubt (1916)

References

External links
IMDb page

Silent film studios
American companies established in 1915
1915 establishments in New York (state)
1916 disestablishments in New York (state)
Defunct film and television production companies of the United States
American companies disestablished in 1916